Karene Agono (born February 25, 1991) is a judoka who competes internationally for Gabon. She is an African Championships bronze medallist.

References

Living people
1991 births
Gabonese female judoka
20th-century Gabonese women
21st-century Gabonese women
African Games medalists in judo
African Games gold medalists for Gabon
Competitors at the 2019 African Games